Wesley Corners is a community situated in the Town of Whitchurch–Stouffville, Ontario, Canada.

The hamlet is located at the intersection of Woodbine Avenue (east of Highway 404) and York Regional Road 15/ Aurora Road. It was originally known as Hacking's Corners, after Rev. James Hacking who settled there in 1817. A Methodist Church was constructed of logs on the north-west corner in 1840; it was replaced by the current brick structure in 1881. The hamlet eventually became known as Wesley, in honour of the founder of the Methodist movement, John Wesley.

Today a service station and coffee shop are found on the south-west corner, and an auto repair shop on the south-east corner. Ducks Unlimited, a wetland and wildlife conservation organization, is on the north-east corner.

References

Communities in Whitchurch-Stouffville